Leonard Aloysius Patrick Malaghan (18 February 1906 – 25 December 1967) was a New Zealand dairy factory manager, ice-cream manufacturer, businessman and benefactor. He was born in Queenstown, Central Otago, New Zealand on 18 February 1906. He headed the Tip Top Ice Cream Company (now part of the Fonterra Co-operative Group).

Malaghan developed Hodgkin's disease, which he died of in 1967. Prior to his death, he and his wife, Ann, donated £200,000 of shares to the Wellington Medical Research Foundation. The gift was used to establish what is now the Malaghan Institute of Medical Research.

Malaghan was inducted into the New Zealand Business Hall of Fame in 2007.

References

1906 births
1967 deaths
New Zealand philanthropists
People from Queenstown, New Zealand
20th-century New Zealand businesspeople
Fonterra people
20th-century philanthropists